ADSF may refer to:

 Asian DanceSport Federation
 Denver's Art District on Santa Fe, an arts and cultural district in Denver, Colorado, U.S.
 Resistin, also known as adipose tissue-specific secretory factor
 Automated Directional Solidification Furnace, a secondary payload of space shuttle mission STS-26